Xuan may refer to:

 Xuancheng, formerly Xuan Prefecture (Xuanzhou), Anhui, China
 Xuanzhou District, seat of Xuancheng and Xuan Prefecture
 Xuan paper, from Xuan Prefecture
 Xuan (surname), Chinese surname
 Xuan (given name)

Chinese rulers posthumously named Xuan
 King Xuan (disambiguation)
 Emperor Xuan (disambiguation)
 Duke Xuan (disambiguation)
 Marquis Xuan of Cai (died 715 BC), ruler of the State of Cai